Bob Lemmon House is a historic farmhouse located near Winnsboro, Fairfield County, South Carolina.  It was built about 1850, and is a two-story, frame I-house.  It has a gable roof, a single pile, central hall plan, and rear shed room additions. The façade features a two-tiered pedimented portico with four wooden Tuscan order columns. The property also includes a shed (c. 1910) and a barn (c. 1890), both of frame construction sheathed in weatherboard.

It was added to the National Register of Historic Places in 1984.

References

Houses on the National Register of Historic Places in South Carolina
Houses completed in 1850
Houses in Fairfield County, South Carolina
National Register of Historic Places in Fairfield County, South Carolina